The Château Dufresne (also known as the Dufresne House) is a historic building in the borough of Mercier–Hochelaga-Maisonneuve in Montreal, Quebec, Canada. It currently functions as a historic house museum.

History
Built from 1915 to 1918, the mansion was designed by Marius Dufresne and the Parisian architect Jules Renard in the Beaux-Arts style. The architects based their plans on the Petit Trianon on the grounds of the Palace of Versailles in France. The building has forty rooms covering about 20,000 square feet.

The interior was decorated with a series of murals and ceiling paintings by Guido Nincheri in the 1920s and 1930s. Known for his piety and devout religious leanings, the secular subject matter of the Château Dufresne's interior decor is an exception to the rest of Nincheri's artistic career. Alfred Faniel, a Belgian-born artist, also decorated the house during the same period.

The Château Dufresne was originally divided into two separate households, one for each brother. In 1948, the Dufresne family sold the property to the Congregation of the Holy Cross, which used it as a pavilion annex of the Holy Cross College.

In 1957, the City of Montreal became the new owner of the estate. The Holy Cross College, however, remained as tenant until 1961. The mansion then housed the Montreal Museum of Contemporary Art from 1965 to 1968, and the Montreal Museum of Decorative Arts from 1976 to 1997.

The Château Dufresne was declared a historic monument by the Quebec government in 1976.

Location
Château Dufresne is located at 4040, rue Sherbrooke Est (4040, Sherbrooke Street East), adjacent to the Olympic Stadium and Montreal Botanical Garden, near the Pie-IX subway station. Château Dufresne is situated at an altitude of 35 m.

Affiliations
The museum is affiliated with the CMA, CHIN, and Virtual Museum of Canada.

Gallery

References

External links

Château Dufresne Museum

Beaux-Arts architecture in Canada
Museums in Montreal
Historic house museums in Quebec
Houses completed in 1918
Houses in Montreal
Mercier–Hochelaga-Maisonneuve
Heritage buildings of Quebec